"Eternal Life" is a song composed by Jeff Buckley, released as the fourth and final single from his album Grace. It is believed to have been influenced by a long-time love for Led Zeppelin's music and a wish to emulate them in this song. The track is something of an exception on the album, featuring aggressive, overdriven guitar and bass riffs that contrast with the more intimate, melodic format that otherwise characterizes the album.  "Eternal Life" can also be found on his 1993 EP Live at Sin-é.

Captured on the Live at Sin-é release, is an explanation as to the meaning of this song:

In Buckley's own words, "Eternal Life" was inspired by anger over "the man that shot Martin Luther King, World War II, slaughter in Guyana and the Manson murders."

Track listing
"Eternal Life"
"Eternal Life" (road version)
"Last Goodbye" (live and acoustic in Japan)
"Lover, You Should've Come Over" (live and acoustic in Japan)

Notes

1995 singles
Jeff Buckley songs
Songs written by Jeff Buckley
1994 songs
American hard rock songs